Clerinae is a subfamily of beetles in the family Cleridae.

Genera 
 Allonyx
 Aphelocerus
 Aphelochroa
 Aulicus
 Balcus
 Calendyma
 Caridopus
 Clerus
 Colyphus
 Corynommadius
 Dologenitus
 Dozocolletus
 Enoclerus
 Epiclines
 Erymanthus
 Evenoclerus
 Gyponyx
 Jenjouristia
 Kanaliella
 Languropilus
 Menieroclerus
 Neorthrius
 Nonalatus
 Ohanlonella
 Omadius
 Opilo
 Orthrius
 Perilypus
 Phloiocopus
 Pieleus
 Placopterus
 Priocera
 Pseudoastigmus
 Sedlacekvia
 Stigmatium
 Thanasimodes
 Thanasimus
 Tillicera
 Trichodes
 Wilsonoclerus
 Xenorthrius
 Zenithicola
 †Arawakis

References 

 
 

 
Polyphaga subfamilies